The 2016 Alderney general election was held on 26 November 2016 to elect 5 members of the States of Alderney who will serve until 2020. Prospective candidates were required to be formally nominated before 15 November.

Results

References

External links
States of Alderney-Elections

2016
2016 elections in Europe
2016 in Guernsey
November 2016 events in Europe